Heinrich Borgmann (15 August 1912 – 5 April 1945) was a German officer during World War II. He was seriously injured by the 20 July plot bomb planted by Colonel Claus von Stauffenberg at the Wolf's Lair headquarters in Rastenburg, East Prussia.

Biography

He joined the infantry in 1932 and by the outbreak of World War II was a Hauptmann. He took part in the invasions of Poland in 1939 and France and he was awarded the Knights Cross of the Iron Cross for his role in the latter campaign on 19 July 1940. Borgmann was then posted to the Eastern Front and was awarded the Oak Leaves to the Knight's Cross of the Iron Cross on 11 February 1942 when serving with Infanterie-Regiment 46. He was promoted to major and appointed to the Army Staff at Adolf Hitler's headquarters as an adjutant in October 1943 and was then promoted to Oberstleutnant.

On 20 July 1944 he was standing at the end of the conference table close to von Stauffenberg's briefcase bomb. Generalleutnant Rudolf Schmundt and Oberst Heinz Brandt who were standing to his left and stenographer Heinz Berger to his right were all killed by the explosion, but Borgmann survived with serious injuries.  After recovering he was posted to an infantry division as an Oberst. He was appointed commander of the Volksgrenadier-Division "Scharnhorst". Borgmann was killed during a low-level air attack on his staff car in April 1945.

Awards
 Iron Cross (1939) 2nd Class (14 September 1939) & 1st Class (28 October 1939)
 Knight's Cross of the Iron Cross with Oak Leaves
 Knight's Cross on 19 July 1940 as Oberleutnant and chief of the 9./Infanterie-Regiment 46
 Oak Leaves on 11 February 1942 as Hauptmann and commander of the III./Infanterie-Regiment 46
 Wound Badge 20 July 1944

References

Citations

Bibliography
 
 
 
 

1912 births
1945 deaths
Recipients of the Knight's Cross of the Iron Cross with Oak Leaves
German Army personnel killed in World War II
Adjutants of Adolf Hitler
Deaths by airstrike during World War II
German Army officers of World War II
Military personnel from Brandenburg
People from Angermünde